Cucullia calendulae is a moth of the family Noctuidae. It is widespread in all parts of the Mediterranean Basin, from northern Africa to Saudi Arabia, Lebanon, Jordan, Israel, Transcaucasus, Turkmenistan, Iran and Afghanistan.

The imago is very similar to Cucullia chamomillae but the ground colour is paler grey and the markings slighter.

Adults are on wing from November to April. There is one generation per year.

The larvae feed on Asteraceae species, including Calendula, Achillea, Anthemis and Ormenis. In Egypt it has been recorded on Chrysanthemum coronarium.

External links

 Fauna Europaea
 Lepiforum.de

Cucullia
Moths described in 1835
Moths of Africa
Moths of Asia
Moths of Europe
Taxa named by Georg Friedrich Treitschke